iPartment  (pinyin: Àiqíng Gōngyù), is a sitcom from Mainland China. It was produced by the Shanghai Film Group and Shanghai Film Studio, and aired by Jiangxi TV in August 2009, with twenty 45-minute episodes.

The second season aired episodes online due to its online fan base and polls for upcoming episodes. The second season featured four of the same characters from the first season with three new characters. The third season followed with the same cast.

A film adaptation, Love Apartment, was filmed and released in 2018, and featured most of the cast reprising their roles.

The show is generally regarded as one of the most successful Chinese sitcoms of all time, mainly among the Post-80's generation and Generation Z due to the advent of streaming services and TV reruns. It is one of the first Chinese shows to depict modern young urban society and references wider Western pop culture phenomenon.

Premise
The show details the lives of seven young adults in their mid-to-late 20s who are neighbors in an apartment complex in Shanghai, "iPartment," which was opened to young couples in love for heavily discounted prices by a wealthy philanthropist who was moved by a wedding.

Cast
 Jin Shijia (Kim Jin) as Lu Zhanbo
 Zhao Ji (Evonne Zhao) as Lin Wanyu
 Chen He (Michael Chen) as Zeng Xiaoxian
 Lou Yixiao (Loura Lou) as Hu Yifei
 Sun Yizhou (Sean Sun) as Lü Ziqiao
 Li Jinming (Kimi Li) as Chen Meijia
 Wang Chuanjun (Eric Wang) as Sekiya Kamiki (Chinese: Guangu Shenqi)
 Deng Jiajia as Tang Youyou
 Li Jiahang (Jean Li) as Zhang Wei/Snake
 Zhao Wenqi (Vanessa Zhao) as Qin Yumo
 Rong Rong as Lisa Rong
 Kenichi Miura as Sekiya Kenjiro
 Cheng Guo (Loyce Cheng) as Zhuge Dali
 Wan Zilin (Catharine Wan) as Curry sauce
 Zhang Yiduo (Zac Zhang) as Zhao Haitang

Episodes

Season 1 (2009)

Season 2 (2011)

Season 3 (2012)

Season 4 (2014)
</onlyinclude>

Summary

Season 1
There are seven young adults who have different backgrounds, ideals, and identities, that live in an unlike apartment. Hu Yifei is a PhD graduate who lectures at a university and lives with her stepbrother Lu Zhanbo and late-night talk show host Zeng Xiaoxian. After Zhanbo graduates from MIT, he meets a girl, Lin Wanyu, who is the daughter of a billionaire banker. Wanyu ran away from home to avoid her engagement, so she moves into iPartment. The apartment owner sets a rule: if a couple moves in, they only pay half rent and do not need to pay for utilities. Lu Ziqiao and Chen Meijia try to save money by pretending to be a couple and move into iPartment. The rent is still expensive for them, so they find a Japanese cartoonist, Sekiya Kamiki, to move in with them.

Season 2
Three new residents move into the apartment: Zhang Wei, Tang Youyou, and Qin Yumo.

Season 3
After the grand prize, Xiaoxian continues to live with in iPartment. He buys the bar and becomes the owner. Meijia returns with a man when the residents celebrate the opening of Xiaoxian's bar. Kamiki and Youyou fall in love. After Zhanbo and Wanyu traveled around the world, Zhanbo formally proposes to Wanyu, who refuses. Wanyu leaves iPartment to go to Italy to chase her dream.

Season 4
Xiaoxian and Yifei's careers become successful on their work place. Although Ziqiao and Meijia get back together again, Ziqiao continues hitting on other girls. Kamiki's business is getting better, but it does not fix his relationship with Youyou.

Season 5
The iPartment residents have achieved their goals.

Reception
Much criticism has been directed towards the reuse of jokes and settings from American sitcoms such as Friends, How I Met Your Mother, The Big Bang Theory and The War at Home.

Awards and nominations

References

External links
 iPartment's homepage

2009 Chinese television series debuts
Chinese television sitcoms
Television series by Croton Media